Asaph Hall III (October 15, 1829 – November 22, 1907) was an American astronomer who is best known for having discovered the two moons of Mars, Deimos and Phobos, in 1877. He determined the orbits of satellites of other planets and of double stars, the rotation of Saturn, and the mass of Mars.

Biography
Hall was born in Goshen, Connecticut, the son of Asaph Hall II (1800–42), a clockmaker, and Hannah Palmer (1804–80). His paternal grandfather Asaph Hall I (June 11, 1735 – March 29, 1800) was a Revolutionary War officer and Connecticut state legislator.  His father died when he was 13, leaving the family in financial difficulty, so Hall left school at 16 to become an apprentice to a carpenter. He later enrolled at the New-York Central College in McGrawville, New York, where he studied mathematics. There he took classes from an instructor of geometry and German, Angeline Stickney. In 1856 they married.

In 1856, Hall took a job at the Harvard College Observatory in Cambridge, Massachusetts, and turned out to be an expert computer of orbits. Hall became assistant astronomer at the US Naval Observatory in Washington, D.C. in 1862, and within a year of his arrival he was made professor.

On June 5, 1872 Hall submitted an article entitled "On an Experimental Determination of Pi" to the journal Messenger of Mathematics. The article appeared in the 1873 edition of the journal, volume 2, pages 113–114. In this article Hall reported the results of an experiment in random sampling that Hall had persuaded his friend, Captain O.C. Fox, to perform when Fox was recuperating from a wound received at the Second Battle of Bull Run. The experiment involved repetitively throwing at random a fine steel wire onto a plane wooden surface ruled with equidistant parallel lines. Pi was computed as 2ml/an where m is the number of trials, l is the length of the steel wire, a is the distance between parallel lines, and n was the number of intersections. This paper, an experiment on the Buffon's needle problem, is a very early documented use of random sampling (which Nicholas Metropolis would name the Monte Carlo method during the Manhattan Project of World War II) in scientific inquiry.

In 1875 Hall was given responsibility for the USNO 26-inch (66-cm) telescope, the largest refracting telescope in the world at the time. It was with this telescope that he discovered Phobos and Deimos in August 1877. Hall also noticed a white spot on Saturn which he used as a marker to ascertain the planet's rotational period. In 1884, Hall showed that the position of the elliptical orbit of Saturn's moon, Hyperion, was retrograding by about 20° per year. Hall also investigated stellar parallaxes and the positions of the stars in the Pleiades star cluster.

Hall was responsible for apprenticing Henry S. Pritchett at the Naval Observatory in 1875.

Discovery of Phobos and Deimos
During Mars' closest approach in 1877, Hall was encouraged by Angeline Stickney, his wife, to search for the Martian moons. His calculations have shown that the orbit should be very close to the planet. Hall wrote "The chance of finding a satellite appeared to be very slight, so that I might have abandoned the search had it not been for the encouragement of my wife."

Asaph Hall discovered Deimos on August 12, 1877 at about 07:48 UTC and Phobos on August 18, 1877, at the US Naval Observatory in Washington, D.C., at about 09:14 GMT (contemporary sources, using the pre-1925 astronomical convention that began the day at noon, give the time of discovery as 11 August 14:40 and 17 August 16:06 Washington mean time respectively). At the time, he was deliberately searching for Martian moons. Hall had previously seen what appeared to be a Martian moon on August 10, but due to bad weather, he could not definitively identify them until later.

Hall recorded his discovery of Phobos in his notebook as follows:

Hall retired from the Navy in 1891. He became a lecturer in celestial mechanics at Harvard University in 1896, and continued to teach there until 1901.

Family
The Halls had four children. Asaph Hall, Jr. (1859–1930) became an astronomer, Samuel Stickney Hall (1864–1936) worked for Mutual Life Insurance Company, Angelo Hall (1868–1922) became a Unitarian minister and professor of mathematics at the US Naval Academy, and Percival Hall (1872–1953) became president of Gallaudet University. Angeline Hall died in 1892. Hall married Mary Gauthier after he fully retired to Goshen, Connecticut in 1901.

Hall died in November 1907 while visiting his son Angelo in Annapolis, Maryland.

Awards and honors

Hall was elected as a member to the American Philosophical Society in 1878. He won the Lalande Prize of the French Academy of Sciences in 1878, the Gold Medal of the Royal Astronomical Society in 1879, the Arago Medal in 1893, and was made a Chevalier in the Ordre national de la Légion d'honneur (French Legion of Honor) in 1896. In 1885, he was President of the Philosophical Society of Washington. Hall crater on the Moon as well as Hall crater on the Martian moon Phobos are named in his honor.

References

Further reading
Angelo Hall. An Astronomer's Wife: The Biography of Angeline Hall. Baltimore: Nunn & Company, 1908. (This book is public domain in the United States; a full scan can be found at archive.org.)
Percival Hall. Asaph Hall, Astronomer. Self-published, nd. (booklet, 46 pp.)
George William Hill. A Biographical Memoir of Asaph Hall, 1829–1907. Judd and Detwiler: Washington, DC, 1908. (This book is public domain in the United States; a full scan can be found at archive.org.)

External links

 The History of the Detroit Observatory at www.umich.edu
 Washington DC anecdotes
 Mrs. Hall's bio
 Asaph Hall's gravestone
National Academy of Sciences Biographical Memoir

1829 births
1907 deaths
American astronomers
Harvard University staff
Discoverers of moons
Recipients of the Gold Medal of the Royal Astronomical Society
Chevaliers of the Légion d'honneur
People from Goshen, Connecticut
Harvard College Observatory people
Members of the United States National Academy of Sciences
Corresponding members of the Saint Petersburg Academy of Sciences
Recipients of the Lalande Prize
New York Central College alumni